The Pansy Craze was an American LGBT movement from 1930 until 1933, during which drag queens, known as "pansy performers", experienced a surge in underground popularity, especially in Los Angeles, New York City, Chicago, and San Francisco. The exact dates of the movement are debated, with a range from the late 1920s until 1935.

History 
The pre-history of the Pansy Craze was rooted in Harlem's Hamilton Lodge masquerade balls in 1869. 

In the 1920s, cabarets and speakeasies featuring female impersonators or drag performers were opened in many cities internationally including in New York, Paris, London, Berlin, and San Francisco. Venues that featured this entertainment were enjoyed by all people, which gave LGBT people a cover. 

The term “pansy craze,” was coined by the historian George Chauncey in the book "Gay New York: Gender, Urban Culture, and the Making of the Gay Male World, 1890-1940" (Basic Books, 1994). The center of the Pansy Craze is also debated, either in New York City, or Chicago; but it had existed in many other United States cities.

Performer Gene Malin is considered the "Queen of the Pansy Craze", he worked primarily in New York City starting in 1930. Malin had ditched wearing gowns and started performing in tuxedos and top hats, as a high-camp gay man. Many acts of the time impersonated Malin's dress style and demeanor but added their own spin, including Gladys Bentley. Bruz Fletcher was a high society gay singer and piano man, working primarily Los Angeles within the Pansy Craze. 

The Pansy Craze culture grew, but was also negatively affected by Prohibition, forcing clubs to close. Malin died in 1933, which had signaled the ending of the movement.

Legacy 
Although the Pansy Craze broadened the range of acceptable behaviors for men, in its aftermath feminine-coded men became more vulnerable to violence as sexuality, gender, and performance became further codified. The aspects of singing style, dress, or gesture that performers had played with became indicative of personal identity, rather than performance style.

See also
 Karyl Norman
 Ray Bourbon

References

Further reading
George Chauncey: Gay New York: Gender, Urban Culture, and the Making of the Gay Male World, 1890–1940 (Basic Books, 1994), especially Chapter 11: "Pansies on Parade"
 Chad Heap, Slumming: Sexual and Racial Encounters in American Nightlife, 1885–1940 (University of Chicago Press, 2009), especially Chapter 6, "The Pansy and Lesbian Craze in White and Black"

External links
 Queer Music Heritage: "The Pansy Craze: the Story and the Music by JD Doyle
 Queer Cultural Center – Bentley Profile.
 Baltimore Afro American contemporary articles

LGBT history in the United States
Musical theatre
1930s in LGBT history
Drag (clothing)